Gary Smethurst Cooper (born 15 February 1955) is a former English footballer who played as a forward for Rochdale, Southport, Lancaster City and Horwich RMI. He also had trials with Bolton Wanderers and Oldham Athletic without making a first team appearance.

References

Living people
Leigh Genesis F.C. players
Bolton Wanderers F.C. players
Oldham Athletic A.F.C. players
Rochdale A.F.C. players
Southport F.C. players
Lancaster City F.C. players
1955 births
Footballers from Bolton
People from Horwich
English footballers
Association football forwards